The following lists events that happened during 1970 in Greece.

Incumbents
Monarch: Constantine II
Regent: Georgios Zoitakis
Prime Minister: Georgios Papadopoulos

Events

Deaths

 15 February – Dimitrios Loundras, gymnast (born 1885)

References

 
Years of the 20th century in Greece
Greece
Greece
1970s in Greece